Falardeau is a surname. Notable people with the name include:

Jean-Charles Falardeau (1914–1989), Canadian sociologist
Johanne Falardeau, Canadian badminton player
Philippe Falardeau (born 1968), Canadian filmmaker
Pierre Falardeau (1946–2009), Canadian filmmaker

See also
Saint-David-de-Falardeau, Quebec, a village in Quebec, Canada